James Kelman (born 9 June 1946) is a Scottish novelist, short story writer, playwright and essayist. His novel A Disaffection was shortlisted for the Booker Prize and won the James Tait Black Memorial Prize for Fiction in 1989. Kelman won the 1994 Booker Prize with How Late It Was, How Late. In 1998, Kelman was awarded the Glenfiddich Spirit of Scotland Award. His 2008 novel Kieron Smith, Boy won both of Scotland's principal literary awards: the Saltire Society's Book of the Year and the Scottish Arts Council Book of the Year.

Life and work 
Born in Glasgow, Kelman says:
My own background is as normal or abnormal as anyone else's. Born and bred in Govan and Drumchapel, inner city tenement to the housing scheme homeland on the outer reaches of the city. Four brothers, my mother a full time parent, my father in the picture framemaking and gilding trade, trying to operate a one man business and I left school at 15 etc. etc. (...) For one reason or another, by the age of 21/22 I decided to write stories. The stories I wanted to write would derive from my own background, my own socio-cultural experience. I wanted to write as one of my own people, I wanted to write and remain a member of my own community.

Kelman himself stated his key influences came from "two literary traditions, the European Existential and the American Realist", although his style was also influenced by the modernist movement. Kelman has mentioned Émile Zola, Albert Camus, Franz Kafka, Fyodor Dostoevsky, Jack Kerouac, Samuel Beckett and James Joyce as some of the influences on his writing.

Short stories
During the 1970s Kelman published his first collection of short stories. He became involved in Philip Hobsbaum's creative writing group in Glasgow, along with Tom Leonard, Alasdair Gray, Liz Lochhead, Aonghas MacNeacail and Jeff Torrington, and his short stories began to appear in magazines. These stories introduced a distinctive style, expressing first-person internal monologues in a pared-down prose using Glaswegian speech patterns, though avoiding for the most part the quasi-phonetic rendition of Tom Leonard. Kelman's developing style has been influential on the succeeding generation of Scottish novelists, including Irvine Welsh, Alan Warner and Janice Galloway.

In 1998, Kelman received the Stakis Prize for "Scottish Writer of the Year" for his collection of short stories The Good Times, one of several books of his stories that have been published. In 2012, a film was made based on the short story "Greyhound For Breakfast".

Novels
Kelman's first published novel was The Busconductor Hines (1984), although it was written after A Chancer, which was published in 1985. His 1989 novel A Disaffection was shortlisted for the Booker Prize and won the James Tait Black Memorial Prize for Fiction, and he won the 1994 Booker Prize for How Late It Was, How Late. His 2008 novel Kieron Smith, Boy won the Saltire Society's Book of the Year and the Scottish Arts Council Book of the Year.

Kelman's most recent novel, God's Teeth and Other Phenomena (2022), was described in a review by Gerry Hassan as a "tour de force [that] works as both a roman a clef, a writing primer and a guide to the world of literature and publishing. ... an astonishing book that confirms James Kelman's right to be seen as a global literary figure beyond any doubt."

Critical reception 
Kelman's 1994 Booker Prize win was, at the time, controversial due to what some saw as the book's casual use of strong language: one of the judges, Rabbi Julia Neuberger, denounced the awarding of the prize to Kelman's book as "a disgrace". Another judge, critic James Wood, recalls that "Kelman turned up at the foolishly formal, black-tie award dinner in a regular business suit and an open-necked shirt, the rebellious semiotics of which were quickly understood, and spoke about how the writer must stand up to oppression: 'My culture and my language have the right to exist, and no one has the authority to dismiss that. . . . A fine line can exist between élitism and racism. On matters concerning language and culture, the distance can sometimes cease to exist altogether.  Kelman has since said that his Booker Prize win, specifically the negative publicity and attacks made as a result, made publishers more reluctant to handle his work.

The debate surrounding the use of this "offensive" language has been picked up by Kelman himself, who argues that the "Standard English" of traditional English novels is unrealistic. In his essay "The Importance of Glasgow in My Work", he compares the presentation of working-class and Scottish characters with those of the traditional "upper-class" English protagonist:

In 2020, Douglas Stuart on becoming the second Scottish writer to be awarded the Booker Prize, for his novel Shuggie Bain, said that his life was changed by Kelman's win with How Late It Was, How Late: "It is such a bold book, the prose and stream of consciousness is really inventive. But it is also one of the first times I saw my people, my dialect, on the page." As Stuart noted: "When James won in the mid-90s, Scottish voices were seen as disruptive and outside the norm."

Political views and activism 
Kelman's work has been described as flowing "not only from being an engaged writer, but a cultural and political activist". At the time of Glasgow's Year as City of Culture, Kelman was prominent in the Workers' City group, critical of the celebrations. The name was chosen as to draw attention to the renaming of part of the city centre as the Merchant City, which they described as promoting the "fallacy that Glasgow somehow exists because of (...) 18th century entrepreneurs and far-sighted politicians. (The merchants) were men who trafficked in degradation, causing untold misery, death and starvation to thousands" The Workers' City group campaigned against what was seen as the victimisation of People's Palace curator Elspeth King and a Council attempt to sell off one third of Glasgow Green. Their activities drew the ire of Labour Party councillors and commentators, with Kelman and his colleagues Hugh Savage and Farquhar McLay being described as "an 'embarrassment' to the city's 'cultural workforce.

Kelman was involved in the Edinburgh Unemployed Workers Centre, giving a speech at its opening, and he has expressed support for the Autonomous Centre of Edinburgh (ACE), its successor organisation.

Kelman has been a prominent campaigner, notably in issues of social justice and traditional left-wing causes, although he is resolutely not a party man, and remains at his heart a libertarian socialist anarchist, saying "the parliamentary opposition parties are essential to the political apparatus of this country which is designed to arrest justice".

In 1990, Kelman took part in an evening of international prose readings at the ninth International Book Fair of Radical Black and Third World Books, subsequently joining the Book Fair's organising committee and establishing the associated Scottish Book Fair of Radical Black and Third World Books, held in Glasgow, 1993 and 1995.

In his introduction to Born up a Close: Memoirs of a Brigton Boy (2006), an edition of Glaswegian political campaigner Hugh Savage's writings, Kelman sums up his understanding of the history of national and class conflict as follows:
In an occupied country indigenous history can only be radical. It is a class issue. The intellectual life of working-class people is ‘occupied’. In a colonised country intellectual occupation takes place throughout society. The closer to the ruling class we get the less difference there exists in language and culture, until finally we find that questions fundamental to society at its widest level are settled by members of the same closely knit circle, occasionally even the same family or ‘bloodline’. And the outcome of that can be war, the slaughter of working-class people.

Despite reservations about nationalism, Kelman has voiced his support for Scottish independence, stating: "Any form of nationalism is dangerous, and should be treated with caution. I cannot accept nationalism and I am not a Scottish Nationalist. But once that is said, I favour a Yes or No decision on independence and I shall vote Yes to independence."  He has voiced criticism of Scottish arts funding council Creative Scotland.

Personal life

In 1969, Kelman married Marie Connors from South Wales. He lives in Glasgow with his wife and their children, though has also lived in London, Manchester, the Channel Islands, Australia and America.

Bibliography

Memoir
 What I Do (2020)

Short stories
 An Old Pub Near The Angel (1973)
 Three Glasgow Writers (1976, with Alex Hamilton and Tom Leonard)
 Short Tales from the Night Shift (1978)
 Not Not While The Giro (1983)
 Lean Tales (1985, with Alasdair Gray and Agnes Owens)
 Greyhound for Breakfast (1987) (winner of the Cheltenham Prize for Literature)
 The Burn (1991)
 Seven Stories (CD audio recording read by Kelman, AK Press, 1996)
 The Good Times (1998)
 Where I Was (selection of stories from Lean Tales; Penguin, 2005).
 If It Is Your Life (2010)
 A Lean Third (2014)
 That Was a Shiver (2017)
 Tales of Here & Then (2020)

Novels
 The Busconductor Hines (1984)
 A Chancer (1985)
 A Disaffection (1989)
 How Late It Was, How Late (1994) (winner of the Booker Prize)
 Translated Accounts (2001)
 You Have to Be Careful in the Land of the Free (2004)
 Kieron Smith, Boy (2008)
 Mo Said She Was Quirky (2012)
 Dirt Road (2016)
 God's Teeth and Other Phenomena (PM Press, 2022)

Essays

 "And the Judges Said..." Essays (Edinburgh: Birlinn, 2002)
 The Freedom to Think Kurdistan (thi wurd, 2019)
 With Noam Chomsky, Between Thought and Expression Lies a Lifetime: Why Ideas Matter (PM Press, 2021)

Plays
Hardie and Baird & Other Plays (1991)

As editor
An East End Anthology, ed. Jim Kelman (1988)
Hugh Savage, Born up a Close: Memoirs of a Brigton boy, ed. James Kelman (2006)

Book-length critical works on Kelman
 Dietmar Böhnke, Kelman Writes Back (1999)
 H. Gustav Klaus, James Kelman: Writers and their Work (2004)
 J. D. Macarthur, Claiming Your Portion of Space: A study of the short stories of James Kelman (2007)
 Simon Kovesi, James Kelman (Manchester University Press, 2007)
 Scott Hames (ed.), The Edinburgh Companion to James Kelman (Edinburgh University Press, 2010) 
 Mitch Miller & Johnny Rodger, The Red Cockatoo: James Kelman and the Art of Commitment (Sandstone Press, 2011)
 Aaron Kelly, James Kelman: Politics and Aesthetics (Peter Lang, 2013)

References

External links

  (includes a "Critical Perspective" section)
 How Late It Was, How Late: a play created by Rude Mechanicals in Austin, Texas (2003).
 "Make yer point": James Kelman, The Guardian, 11 August 2007 This article has been removed because the copyright has expired.
 "James Kelman Collection", Spirit of Revolt.
 WB Gooderham, "Taking another look at James Kelman", The Guardian, 21 September 2010.
 Bethany Stuart, "James Kelman: The Beloved Vandal of British Literature", Culture Trip, 12 December 2015.
 Cameron Twiddy, "An audience with James Kelman", Dundee University Review of the Arts, 28 July 2017.
 "An evening with James Kelman", PM Press.
 Scott Hames, "James Kelman Bibliography"

1946 births
20th-century British novelists
20th-century British short story writers
20th-century essayists
21st-century British novelists
21st-century British short story writers
21st-century essayists
Booker Prize winners
James Tait Black Memorial Prize recipients
Living people
People from Govan
Proletarian literature
Scottish dramatists and playwrights
Scottish essayists
Scottish novelists
Scottish people of Irish descent
Scottish republicans
Scottish short story writers
Scottish socialists
Scottish writers
Writers from Glasgow